Great Aceh Regency is a regency of the Indonesian province of Aceh. The regency covers an area of 2,903.49 square kilometres and had a population of 351,418 at the 2010 Census and 405,535 at the 2020 Census; the official estimate as at mid 2021 was 409,527. The Regency is located at the northwest tip of Sumatra island and surrounds the provincial capital of Banda Aceh. It includes a number of islands off the northern tip of Sumatra, which comprise Pulo Aceh District within the regency. The seat of the Regency government is the town of Jantho.

Economy 
Aceh Besar Regency produces cloves, nutmeg and palm oil and rice, and also small quantities of maize, cassava, sweet potatoes and beans.

Landmarks

Museums 
Aceh Besar Regency contains several museums. The Museum dan Rumoh Aceh is the State Museum, located in Banda Aceh. The museum's main building is built in the style of a traditional Acehnese house. It was installed by Dutch Governor Van Swart in 1915. Museum Ali Hasymi contains the personal collection of Ali Hasymi, a former governor of Aceh and artist and include books by the scholars of Acehnese past, ancient ceramics, the typical weapons of Aceh, souvenirs from all over the world, etc. Museum Cut Nyak Dhien was originally the home of the heroine Cut Nyak Dhien.
The ancient Abee Tanoh Library, located at the foot of Mount Seulawa contains some important manuscripts.

Places of worship 
Indra Puri Old Mosque is located about 20 km south of Medan. Indra Puri was a Hindu kingdom and it was a place of worship before Islam arrived. Later, Sultan Iskandar Muda introduced Islam to the public. After the people embraced Islam, the previous temple was converted into a mosque. The mosque site covers an area of 33,875 m2, and is located approximately 150 metres from the edge of the Krueng Aceh River.

Fortress and tombs 
Indra Patra Fortress is situated 19 km from Banda Aceh at Krueng Raya. According to history it was built under the Indra Puri Hindu kingdom, although some say that the fort was built during the Sultanate of Aceh Darussalam in an effort to resist the Portuguese. The fort had a very important function at the time of Sultan Iskandar Muda.

The Tomb of Admiral Malahayati is located about 32 km from the city of Banda Aceh.

Administrative divisions 
The regency is divided administratively into twenty-three districts (Indonesian: kecamatan), which comprise 604 villages (Indonesian: gampong). The areas of the districts and their populations at the 2010 Census and the 2020 Census, together with the official estimates as at mid 2021, are listed below. These are grouped below into three sections for convenience, which have no administrative significance. The table also includes the locations of the district administrative centres, the number of administrative villages (gampong) in each district, and its post code.

Notes: (a) comprises a group of islands off the north-western tip of Sumatra, of which the largest are Pulau Breuh, Pulau Nasi and Pulau Teunom. (b) includes some smaller islands off the north-western tip of Sumatra but closer to the mainland than Pulo Aceh District - Pulau Bunta and Pulau Batee. (c) comprises southern suburbs of Banda Aceh city, with 105,835 inhabitants in mid 2021.

Rusa Island
Rusa Island in Lhoong district was shaped like Rusa (deer) before the tsunami struck the island on 26 December 2004, but now that much of it has been washed away, the form of the island has changed and become smaller like a lamb embryo. The island is very important for marking Indonesia's boundaries due to its location as the most westerly island in Indonesia with Titik Dasar TD175 and Titik Referensi TR175 (Base Point TD175 and Reference Point TR175).

Bunta Island
Since the 2004 tsunami struck Bunta island, 45 minutes by traditional motorised boat from Ujong Pancu Village, Peukan Bada, there are no longer any inhabitants living there. Nowadays some people use the island as a coconut plantation, but they live in Banda Aceh. As the tsunami washed out all of the living creatures there, nowadays there are no squirrels, monkeys or snakes on the island. The island has been popularized by the documentary film Hikayat di Ujung Pesisir and is ideal for camping, but with no facilities at all, and modest snorkeling can be done there.

References 

 
Regencies of Aceh